The Ministry of Environment and Forestry is the cabinet-level, government ministry in the Republic of Indonesia responsible for managing and conserving that nation's forests. The current Minister of Environment and Forestry is Siti Nurbaya Bakar.

History 
Since late 2014, the Ministry of Environment and Ministry of Forestry was merged into Ministry of Environment and Forestry. However, Environment and Forestry management has been an official government concern since Presidential Decree No. 16 of 1972 established the Committee of Formulation and Work Plan to the Government in the Field of Environment following the 1972 World Environment Conference in Stockholm, Sweden.

Environment 
  State Minister Office of Development Monitoring and Environment (1978-1983)
  State Minister Office of Demography and Environment (1983-1993)
  State Minister Office of Environment (1993-2004)
  Department of Environment (2004-2010)
  Ministry of Environment (2010-2014)

Forestry 
  General Directorate of Forestry, Department of Agriculture (-1983)
  Department of Forestry (1983-1998)
  Department of Forestry and Plantation (1998)
  Department of Forestry (1998-2010)
  Ministry of Forestry (2010-2014)

List of Ministers 
 Minister of Environment and Forestry
 Siti Nurbaya Bakar (27 October 2014-)
 Minister of Forestry
 Soedjarwo (27 July 1964 – 25 July 1966 and 19 March 1983 – 11 March 1988)
 Hasjrul Harahap (21 March 1988 – 11 March 1993)

See also 
 Indonesia Forest Rangers
 Directorate General of Forest Protection and Nature Conservation (Indonesia)
 Government of Indonesia

References

External links 
 

Environment and Forestry
Indonesia
Indonesia
Forestry in Indonesia